Blackout (released as The Attic in UK) is a 1988 American thriller film directed  by Doug Adams and starring Gail O'Grady and Carol Lynley.

Premise
Caroline Boyle is drawn to her childhood home in Northern California by a cryptic letter from her father, who abandoned her and her mother when she was a child. She comes back to search for her father, but gradually her terrible suppressed memories return.

Cast 

 Gail O'Grady as  Caroline Boyle
 Carol Lynley as  Esther Boyle
  Michael Keys Hall as Alan Boyle
 Joseph Gian as  Luke Erikson
 Deena Freeman as  Angela Carpenter
 Joanna Miles as Eleanor Carpenter
  Scott Lincoln as  Richard Boyle

References

External links 
 
 

1988 films
1988 thriller films
American thriller films
Films scored by Don Davis (composer)
Films with screenplays by Joseph Stefano
1980s English-language films
1980s American films